Sir Robert Napier, 1st Baronet of Punknoll (164231 October 1700) of Punknoll, in the County of Dorset, was an English lawyer and politician.

He was the son of Robert Napier of Punknoll (d. 1686), the grandson of Sir Nathaniel Napier, also an MP, and the great-grandson of Sir Robert Napier, a judge who had been Chief Baron of the Exchequer in Ireland. His uncle was Gerrard Napier, created a baronet (in 1641) of Middle Marsh and Moor Crichel, who was also a Member of Parliament.

Personal life
He married Sophia Evelyn, the daughter of Charles Evelyn of Godstone, and they had a son, Charles who assumed the baronetcy upon his death in 1700.

Early life and career
He was educated at of Trinity College, Oxford. In 1681, while he served as High Sheriff of Dorset, he was knighted. He was subsequently raised to the Baronetage of Punknoll on 25 February 1682, after which he served as Member of Parliament (MP) for Weymouth (from 1689 to 1690) and Dorchester (in 1690 and from 1698 to his death in 1700).

References

|-

1642 births
1700 deaths
Alumni of Trinity College, Oxford
High Sheriffs of Dorset
17th-century English lawyers
Members of the Parliament of England for Dorchester
English MPs 1689–1690
English MPs 1690–1695
English MPs 1698–1700
Baronets in the Baronetage of England